The correlation between wealth and religion has been subject to academic research. Wealth is the status of being the beneficiary or proprietor of a large accumulation of capital and economic power. Religion is a socio-cultural system that often involves belief in supernatural forces and may intend to provide a moral system or a meaning of life. Jews typically rank as the highest income groups in the United States, with Hindus and Episcopalians behind them.

Statistics

Global 
According to a study from 2015, Christians hold the largest amount of wealth (55% of the total world wealth), followed by Muslims (5.8%), Hindus (3.3%), and Jews (1.1%). According to the same study it was found that adherents under the classification "Irreligion", or other religions, hold about 34.8% of the total global wealth.

A study done by the nonpartisan wealth research firm New World Wealth found that 56.2% of the 13.1 million millionaires in the world were Christians, while 6.5% were Muslims, 3.9% were Hindu, and 1.7% were Jewish; 31.7% were identified as adherents of "other" religions or "not religious".

United States 

A study in the United States (based on data from 1985 to 1998), conducted by the sociologist Lisa A. Keister and published in the Social Forces journal, found that adherents of Judaism and Episcopalianism accumulated the most wealth, believers in Catholicism and mainline Protestants were in the middle, while conservative Protestants accumulated the least; in general, people who attend religious services accumulated more wealth than those who do not (taking into account variations of education and other factors). Keister suggested that wealth accumulation is shaped by family processes. According to the study, the median net worth of people believing in Judaism is calculated at 150,890 USD, while the median net worth of conservative Protestants (including Baptists, Jehovah's Witnesses, Seventh-day Adventists, Christian Scientists) was US$26,200. The overall median in the dataset was US$48,200. 

Some of the wealthiest and most affluent American families such as the Vanderbilts, Astors, Rockefellers, Du Ponts, Roosevelts, Forbes, Fords, Mellons, Whitneys, Morgans, and Harrimans are white primarily mainline Protestant families.

Another study in the United States, from 2012, stated that 48% of Hindus had a household income of $100,000 or more, and 70% make at least $75,000, which is the highest among all religions in United States.

According to a 2014 study by the Pew Research Center, Jewish again ranked as the most financially successful religious group in the United States, with 44% of Jews living in households with incomes of at least $100,000, followed by Hindu (36%), Episcopalians (35%), and Presbyterians (32%). Amongst Jews, in 2016, Modern Orthodox Jews had a median household income of $158,000, while Open Orthodoxy Jews had a median household income of $185,000 (compared to the American median household income of $59,000 in 2016). According to the same study there is correlation between education and income, about 77% of American Hindus have an undergraduate degree and according to a study in 2020, they are earning highest with $137,000, followed by Jews (59%), Episcopalians (56%), and Presbyterians (47%).

Explanations
A study published in the American Journal of Sociology by Lisa Keister, found that "wealth affects religion indirectly through educational attainment, fertility, and female labor force participation" but also found some evidence of direct effects of religion on wealth attainment. Keister notes that certain religious beliefs ("one should have many children", "women should not work") lower wealth accumulation, both on the micro- and macro-scale.

See also 

 Christian views on poverty and wealth
 Economics of religion
 Happiness and religion
 Jewish views of poverty, wealth and charity
 List of fortune deities
 Protestant work ethic
 Religion and peacebuilding
 Religion and business
 Religiosity and intelligence
 Female labor force in the Muslim world

References

Footnotes

Bibliography

Further reading